The Beals and Torrey Shoe Co. Building is located in Watertown, Wisconsin.

History
The Beals and Torrey Shoe Co. built the facility and used it as a factory. The company outgrew the building by 1918 and moved to a different site. For several years after, the building was used as a factory for dairy equipment. It has since been converted into apartments.

The building was listed on the National Register of Historic Places in 1984 and on the State Register of Historic Places in 1989.

References

Industrial buildings and structures on the National Register of Historic Places in Wisconsin
Residential buildings on the National Register of Historic Places in Wisconsin
National Register of Historic Places in Jefferson County, Wisconsin
Brick buildings and structures
Industrial buildings completed in 1904
Shoe factories
1904 establishments in Wisconsin